USS Davidson (FF-1045) was a  destroyer escort, and later a frigate, in the United States Navy. She was named for Vice Admiral Lyal A. Davidson. Davidson was commissioned with the US Navy from 1965 to 1988 and served with the Brazilian Navy from 1989 to 2002. Davidson sank while under tow to be scrapped in India circa in 2005.

History 
The keel for USS Davidson was laid down 30 September 1963 at Avondale Shipyards. The ship was launched and christened 2 October 1964, with Mrs. Lyal A. Davidson, widow of the ship's namesake, as ship sponsor. Davidson was commissioned on 7 December 1965 in Charleston, South Carolina. She was homeported in Pearl Harbor. She deployed to the Western Pacific in support of the Vietnam War. She was redesignated, along with the rest of her class, as a frigate in 1975 with the new hull number FF-1045.

Davidson deployed from Pearl Harbor on her first Western Pacific cruise on 18 April 1967. The ship made port calls to Yokosuka, Japan, Chinhae, Korea, Sasebo, Japan, Subic Bay, Philippines, Hong Kong, Bang Saen, Thailand and Bangkok, Thailand. The ship served in the waters off Vietnam supporting aircraft carriers at Yankee Station and providing naval gunfire support elsewhere off the coast. Davidson returned to Pearl Harbor 23 October 1967.

Davidson departed Pearl Harbor on 23 July 1982. The ship made port calls to Maizuru, Japan, Sasebo, Japan, Pusan, Korea, Subic Bay, Philippines, Tacloban, Philippines, Sattihip, Thailand, Hong Kong and Kagoshima, Japan. Davidson returned to Pearl harbor 28 January 1983.

Military awards and honors

Brazilian service

On 8 December 1988, Davidson was decommissioned. She was transferred to Brazil and commissioned 25 July 1989 as Paraiba (D28). She was decommissioned from the Brazilian Navy on 26 July 2002.

She sank as she was being towed to India to be scrapped, along with the former .

References

External links 

USS Davidson Reunion site
Video of her wreck 

 

Garcia-class frigates
Ships built in Bridge City, Louisiana
1964 ships
Cold War frigates and destroyer escorts of the United States
Vietnam War frigates and destroyer escorts of the United States
Garcia-class frigates of the Brazilian Navy
Pará-class destroyers (1989)
Shipwrecks